Tropiphorus elevatus is a species of broad-nosed weevil in the beetle family Curculionidae.

References

Further reading

External links

 
 

Entiminae
Beetles described in 1882